G. Patrick Riley is an artist, art educator and mask maker from Oklahoma. His masks have been used in productions at the Kennedy Center. His works are in the collections of Mabee-Gerrer Museum of Art, Oklahoma State Capitol, Arkansas Arts Center, AT&T collection and Lady Gaga. In 2011, the Oklahoma Supreme Court awarded Riley a commission to create an eagle sculpture, 28 feet in height, in the atrium of the supreme court building.

Biography
As a four-year-old child, Riley's family would visit Fr. Gregory Gerrer's museum on the campus of St. Gregory's University In Shawnee, Oklahoma. He credits these experiences as having a significant impact on his artistic career, specifically his exposure to Tutu the mummy, the taxidermy animal collection and the African mask collection.

Riley studied at East Central University for two years from 1959 to 1961. He finished his bachelor's degree at University of Oklahoma in 1962. He later completed his master's degree at University of Oklahoma in 1972.

In 2010, the Ford Center commissioned Riley to design and create a mask as a gift for Lady Gaga. Riley purchased a copy of her biography and watched her music videos for inspiration for his design.

Exhibitions
"Celestial Connections: The Art of G. Patrick Riley, Sharon Montgomery, and Glen Henry", Mabee-Gerrer Museum of Art, September 10, 2022 - October 23, 2022
"Magical Mystery Masks: The Art of G. Patrick Riley", Mabee-Gerrer Museum of Art, September – October 2011
"Alumni Exhibition", Pogue Art Gallery, East Central University; August 2013

Recognition
Governor's Arts Award, Arts in Education, 1995
Governor's Arts Award, Special Recognition, 2011
Paseo Art Association, Lifetime Achievement Award, 2011

References

External links
 Patrick Riley on the Oklahoma Arts Council's Teaching Roster

University of Oklahoma alumni
Artists from Oklahoma
People from Ada, Oklahoma
Living people
Date of birth missing (living people)
Year of birth missing (living people)